Black Up is the debut studio album by American hip hop duo Shabazz Palaces.  It was released on June 28, 2011 in the United States on Sub Pop. The album was produced by Knife Knights at Gunbeat Serenade Studio in Outplace Palacelands."

Reception

Critical reception 

Black Up received widespread critical acclaim; many commented on the experimental song structures and intricate lyricism. Review aggregator Metacritic gave the album a normalised rating of 83 out of 100, based on reviews from 36 critics, indicating "universal acclaim". Metacritic included Black Up in its "Midyear Report: The Best Music of 2011 So Far."

In his review for MSN Music, music critic Robert Christgau said that, misleading titles notwithstanding, the album "improves mightily when the volume is high enough to break the beats into components so they're impossible to ignore." Jon Pareles, writing in The New York Times, viewed the album as proof that hip hop "still has an audacious progressive fringe." Kitty Empire of The Observer wrote that, although it is not game-changing, Black Up resonate with listeners in a way the conventional hip hop cannot because each track is "lean and muscular, never losing sight of the fact that hip-hop should writhe inexorably forward." In 2019, Pitchfork ranked Black Up at number 179 on their list of "The 200 Best Albums of the 2010s"; cultural critic Hanif Abdurraqib wrote: "From great mystery exploded an album of impossible vision."

Accolades 
{|class="wikitable sortable"
|-
! Publication
! Country
! Accolade
! Year
! Rank
|-
| Mojo
| align="center"| UK
| Top 50 albums of 2011
| 2011
| align="center"|36
|-
| Popmatters
| align="center"| US
| 75 Best Albums of 2011
| 2011
| align="center"|30
|-
| Pitchfork
| align="center"| US
| Best Albums of 2011
| 2011
| align="center"|14
|-
| Pitchfork
| align="center"| US
| The 200 Best Albums of the 2010s
| 2019
| align="center"| 179
|-
| Hip Hop Is Read
| align="center"| US
| Top 25 Hip Hop Albums of 2011
| 2011
| align="center"|10
|-
|Epitonic
| align="center"| US
| Top 40 Albums of 2011
| 2011
| align="center"|4
|-
|Gorilla vs. Bear
| align="center"| US
| Albums of 2011
| 2011
| align="center"|1
|-
|Gorilla vs. Bear
| align="center"| US
| Albums of the Decade: 2010-2019
| 2019
| align="center"|5
|-
|Prefixmag
| align="center"| US
| Top 50 Albums of 2011
| 2011
| align="center"|1
|-
|The Seattle Times
| align="center"| US
| Best Pop Music 2011
| 2011
| align="center"|1
|-
|Potholes In My Blog
| align="center"| US
|Top 15 Albums of 2011
| 2011
| align="center"|1
|-
|Cokemachineglow
| align="center"| US
| Top 50 Albums of 2011
| 2011
| align="center"|1
|-
|}

Track listing

Personnel 
 Shabazz Palaces
 Ishmael Butler (aka Palaceer Lazaro) – vocals
 Tendai Maraire – instrumentation

 Additional personnel
 THEESatisfaction – guest vocals
 Blood – mixing
 Dumb Eyes – artwork
 Knife Knights – production

Charts

References

External links 
 

2011 debut albums
Sub Pop albums
Shabazz Palaces albums